Marlenheim is a commune in the Bas-Rhin department and Grand Est region of north-eastern France.

Twin towns 

Marlenheim is twinned with Bouillante (Guadeloupe, France).

See also 
 Communes of the Bas-Rhin department

References 

Bas-Rhin communes articles needing translation from French Wikipedia
Communes of Bas-Rhin